Radioconus riochcoensis is a species  of small air-breathing land snails, terrestrial pulmonate gastropod mollusks in the family Charopidae. This species is endemic to Brazil.

References 

Radioconus
Molluscs of Brazil
Endemic fauna of Brazil
Gastropods described in 1939
Taxonomy articles created by Polbot